Vincens Grandjean (18 September 1898 – 19 April 1970) was a Danish equestrian. He competed in two events at the 1936 Summer Olympics.

Biography
Grandjean grew up on the Vennerslund estate on Falster. He owned it from 1940.

References

1898 births
1970 deaths
Danish male equestrians
Olympic equestrians of Denmark
Equestrians at the 1936 Summer Olympics